Orchard Park is an incorporated town in Erie County, New York. It is an outer ring suburb southeast of Buffalo. As of the 2010 census, the population was 29,054, representing an increase of 5.13% from the 2000 census figure. The town contains a village also named Orchard Park. Orchard Park is one of the Southtowns of Erie County and is best known as the site of Highmark Stadium, home of the National Football League's Buffalo Bills.

History
In 1803, Didymus C. Kinney and wife Phebe (Hartwell) purchased land and built a cabin in the southwest corner of the township, which has since been turned into a museum. The following year, a migration of Quaker settlers began.

The town was separated from the town of Hamburg in 1850 and was first named "Ellicott", after Joseph Ellicott, an agent of the Holland Land Company. Within months, the name was changed to the town of "East Hamburgh". Around 1934, the town was renamed "Orchard Park" after its principal settlement.

In the early 1900s, a large fire burned down most of the central part of the village of Orchard Park around South Buffalo Street.

The Buffalo, Rochester and Pittsburgh Railroad Station and the Johnson-Jolls Complex are listed on the National Register of Historic Places.

Geography
Orchard Park is located at  (42.7622, -78.7414).

Major routes

U.S. Route 219 passes through the west part of the town and forms junctions with U.S. Route 20A (Quaker Street) and NY 179 (Milestrip Road).

U.S. Route 20 (Southwestern Boulevard) passes through the north part of the town and forms a junction with NY 277 and NY 240 (Orchard Park Road).

Adjacent towns and cities
Town of West Seneca - north
City of Lackawanna - northwest
Town of Hamburg - west
Town of Boston - south
Town of Colden - southeast
Town of Aurora - east
Town of Elma - northeast

Demographics

As of the census of 2010, there were 28,272 people, 11,553 households, and 7,656 families residing in the town. The population density was 717.7 people per square mile (277.1/km2). There were 10,644 housing units at an average density of 276.4 per square mile (106.7/km2).  The racial makeup of the town was 97.9% White, 0.5% Black or African American, 0.2% Native American, 0.9% Asian, <0.1% Pacific Islander, 0.2% from other races, and 0.6% from two or more races. Hispanic or Latino of any race were 1.0% of the population.

There were 10,277 households, out of which 33.7% had children under the age of 18 living with them, 64.3% were married couples living together, 7.6% had a female householder with no husband present, and 25.5% were non-families. 22.1% of all households were made up of individuals, and 10.3% had someone living alone who was 65 years of age or older. The average household size was 2.62 and the average family size was 3.09.

In the town, the population was spread out, with 25.2% under the age of 18, 5.7% from 18 to 24, 25.6% from 25 to 44, 26.8% from 45 to 64, and 16.6% who were 65 years of age or older. The median age was 41 years. For every 100 females, there were 92.6 males. For every 100 females age 18 and over, there were 87.7 males.

The median income for a household in the town was $151,227, and the median income for a family was $112,906. About 1.1% of families and 2.4% of the population were below the poverty line.

Government
The town of Orchard Park has a supervisor-council form of government.  Elected at large positions are Supervisor, Council Member, Clerk, Highway Superintendent and Town Justice. Other appointed positions are Town Attorney and Deputy Attorney, Engineer, Assessor, Building Inspector, Recreation and Youth Services Director and Chief of Police.

Supervisors

Town of Orchard Park 
Eugene Majchrzak (2022–Present)
Joseph Liberti (2020-2021) Served as the Deputy Supervisor w/o voting power
Dr. Patrick J. Keem (2014–2020) (resigned)
Janis Colarusso (2010–2013)
Mary Travers Murphy (2006–2009)
Toni M. Cudney (1998–2005)
Dennis J. Mill (1989–1997)
Eugene B. Woodard (1968–1989)
Clarence F. Henning (1949–1967)
Melvin L. Bong (1938–1948)
Jacob C. Newton (1932–1937)

Town of East Hamburgh  
Clinton Ebenezer Holmes (1923–1931)
Frank F. Holmwood (1900–1922)

Communities and locations in the Town of Orchard Park
Armor – A hamlet at the west town line.
Buffalo, Rochester and Pittsburgh Railroad Station - A former railroad station listed on the National Register of Historic Places.
Chestnut Ridge Park – A popular county park with a wide range of activities, located in the south section of the town on Chestnut Ridge Road (Route 277).
Duells Corner – A hamlet south of Orchard Park village.
Ellicott – A hamlet south of Orchard Park village.
SUNY Erie – The official location of the south campus, although most of the campus is in the adjacent town of Hamburg.
Loveland – A hamlet on the east town line.
Orchard Park – A village located at the junction of Routes 240 and U.S. 20A.
Highmark Stadium – The home stadium of the NFL's Buffalo Bills lies on the western edge of the town in the hamlet of Windom.
Webster Corners – A hamlet north of the village of Orchard Park by the intersection of Webster and Orchard Park Roads.

Education
The Orchard Park Central School District operates four K-5 elementary schools (Eggert, Ellicott, South Davis, and Windom), Orchard Park Middle School, and Orchard Park High School. The mascot for the Orchard Park's athletic teams is a Quaker.

Bryant & Stratton College is in Orchard Park. 
 
Erie Community College (ECC) is at the western town line.

Orchard Park also has a number of private, Catholic schools, including Nativity and St. John Vianney. Our Lady of the Sacred Heart (pre-k through 8), closed in 2014 after exhaustive research conducted by the Diocese of Buffalo on demographics, finances and educational relevance.

Culture

Art
The annual Orchard Park Festival of the Arts, an outdoor art and craft show, is held each year on the third weekend of September, on the campus of Orchard Park Middle School. It is sponsored by the Orchard Park Chamber of Commerce. It was organized as the Quaker Arts Festival in the 1960s by Orchard Parkers John Coleman of The Suburban Press and Chet Seymour of the Orchard Park Presbyterian Church, and was originally held on the grounds of the Orchard Park Presbyterian Church. It was run  by the Orchard Park Jaycees from 1963 to 2017.

Music
Since 1985, under the direction of the Orchard Park Council of the Arts, local businesses and the town of Orchard Park sponsor free outdoor musical entertainment throughout the summer at the pavilion bandstand on the grounds of the middle school.

Organized in 1949, the Orchard Park Symphony Orchestra, composed of more than 70 volunteer musicians, performs four regular concerts each year in the high school auditorium.

The Orchard Park Chorale was founded in 1975 under the sponsorship of the Adult Education Program of the Orchard Park School District. Its more than fifty singers perform regularly at the Orchard Park Presbyterian Church.

Food
Orchard Park is home to Taffy's Hot Dog Stand at the corner of U.S. Route 20 and NY Rtes 240 & 277. Ted's Hot Dogs is located  about 1/8 of a mile north. Big Tree Inn, Homegrown Bistro, Buffalo's Best Grill, Buffalo Sports Garden (BSG), Byrd House, Dove, Duff's, Eckl's, Mangia Ristorante, O'Neill's Stadium Inn and OP Social are other restaurants in town. The town is also home of the 3000th Tim Hortons restaurant location as well as Spot Coffee and Panera. Additional Orchard Park restaurants include Mighty Taco, a Buffalo-area chain restaurant, Charlie the Butcher, located adjacent to a Noco gas station, and the pizzerias Cappelli's, Leo's, Pappacino's, and Ricotta's (two locations).  National chains include and are not limited to Red Robin, Denny's, McDonald's and Wendy's.

Sports

Highmark Stadium, the home stadium of the NFL's Buffalo Bills is located in Orchard Park.
West Herr Field, the home stadium of Erie Community College's football team, is located in Orchard Park adjacent to Highmark Stadium.
The Orchard Park High School football team won the 2008 and 2011 New York State Public High School Class AA Championship.
The Orchard Park High School baseball team won the 1988 State Championship.
The Orchard Park High School volleyball team won the 2008 New York State Championship.
The 1993 and 1994 Orchard Park Little League Baseball team won the New York State Championship.  They recently won five Section titles in three summers with one team winning three in the 10u, 11u, and 12u divisions.

Media

Print newspapers
 The Orchard Park Bee, a weekly newspaper

Notable people

Jim Burt, former NFL nose tackle for the San Francisco 49ers and New York Giants
Wray Carlton, former AFL halfback with the Buffalo Bills who scored the first-ever touchdown for the Bills
Jon Corto, former Buffalo Bills player
Erin Doyle (producer), film producer 
Brian Dux, former professional basketball player
John Gurtler, sportscaster
Eric Herman, children's music entertainer
Dave Hollins, former Major League baseball player (Phillies, Twins, Mariners)
Rick James (1948–2004), musician
John Koelmel, board chairman at Kaleida Health and chairman of the New York Power Authority
Brooke Lauren, film and TV producer
Lex Luger a.k.a. Lawrence ("Larry") Wendell Pfohl, former professional wrestler
Travis Mayer, Olympic silver medalist in freestyle skiing
Sean McDermott, head coach of the Buffalo Bills
Von Miller, NFL outside linebacker for the Buffalo Bills
Brian Moorman, former NFL punter for the Buffalo Bills
John Murphy, play-by-play announcer for the Buffalo Bills
Mary Travers Murphy, executive director of the Family Justice Center of Erie County
Danny Neaverth, disc jockey and TV personality
Lonnie Nielsen, professional golfer
Ron Pitts, former NFL player
William Sadler, actor; Saturn Award winner
Sara Schonour, Baking Impossible winner
Josh Thomas, defensive end for the NFL Indianapolis Colts
Craig Wolfley, former NFL offensive lineman for the Pittsburgh Steelers and Minnesota Vikings
Ron Wolfley, former NFL fullback for the Arizona Cardinals and Cleveland Browns, current radio analyst for Arizona Cardinals

References

External links

Town of Orchard Park official website

Buffalo–Niagara Falls metropolitan area
Towns in Erie County, New York